Drabeši Parish is an administrative unit of Cēsis Municipality in the Vidzeme region of Latvia. The administrative center is Drabeši.

Towns, villages and settlements of Drabeši parish 
 Amata
 Āraiši
 Drabeši
 Ieriķi
 Kārļi
 Līvi
 Meijermuiža

See also 
 Āraiši lake dwelling site
 Drabeši Manor

External links 
 

Parishes of Latvia
Cēsis Municipality
Vidzeme